EGF, latrophilin and seven transmembrane domain-containing protein 1 is a latrophilin-like orphan receptor of the adhesion G protein-coupled receptor family. In humans this protein is encoded by the ELTD1 gene. ELTD1 appears to have a role in angiogenesis, both physiological and pathological in cancer.

See also 
 Latrophilin

References

Further reading 

 
 
 

Adhesion G protein-coupled receptors